Antoine Glenn Harris (born April 8, 1982) is a former American football safety. He was signed by the Tennessee Titans as an undrafted free agent in 2005. He played college football at Louisville.

Harris was also a member of the Atlanta Falcons and Philadelphia Eagles.

Professional career

Tennessee Titans
After going undrafted in the 2005 NFL Draft, Harris was signed by the Tennessee Titans as an undrafted free agent on April 28. He was waived on August 29. The team re-signed him to the practice squad on November 1, where he spent the remainder the season.

Harris was re-signed by the Titans on January 13, 2006. He was waived on September 2 but re-signed to the practice squad the following day, where he spent the entire 2006 regular season.

Atlanta Falcons
Harris was signed with the Atlanta Falcons on January 10, 2007. He appeared in 13 games for the Falcons in 2007, recording 10 tackles (seven solo) and pass defensed.

In 2008, Harris appeared in 12 games for the Falcons and recorded three tackles. He was placed on season-ending injured reserve with a groin injury on December 9.

Harris was re-signed to a one-year contract on March 3, 2009. On December 21, he was placed on injured reserve due to a knee injury.

Philadelphia Eagles
Harris was signed by the Philadelphia Eagles on July 29, 2010. He suffered a Lisfranc sprain during a preseason game against the Jacksonville Jaguars on August 14, and was placed on injured reserve on August 15.

Harris now lives in Florida with his wife and two children.

References

External links
Philadelphia Eagles bio
Atlanta Falcons bio

1982 births
Living people
Players of American football from Columbus, Ohio
American football wide receivers
American football cornerbacks
American football safeties
Louisville Cardinals football players
Atlanta Falcons players